The Cherokee County Courthouse is located in Cherokee, Iowa, United States.  The courthouse is the third structure to house court functions and county administration.

History
A public multipurpose building was moved into the city of Cherokee in 1863. In addition to court functions, it also served as a public hall, schoolroom, and a general utility headquarters. Several attempts to replace the building failed until 1888 when voters agreed to build a combination courthouse and jail. Completed in 1891, the Romanesque Revival-style building featured rusticated limestone on the lower levels, brick on the upper levels, gables on the third story, and a corner clock tower. The present two-story Modernist brick structure replaced it in 1966. Cherokee County issued $475,00 in bonds for its construction. The building was constructed into the side of a slope so that both floors are visible from Main Street, while form North Sixth Street only the upper floor is visible.

References

Government buildings completed in 1966
Modernist architecture in Iowa
County courthouses in Iowa
Buildings and structures in Cherokee County, Iowa
Cherokee, Iowa
1966 establishments in Iowa